David Vernon Williams  is a professor, and former deputy dean of the University of Auckland's Faculty of Law. He comes from the Hawke's Bay region of New Zealand, and was educated at Wanganui Collegiate School.

His formal tertiary education qualifications include undergraduate degrees in history and in law (BA/LLB) from Victoria University of Wellington, a graduate degree in law (BCL) from the University of Oxford, England, where he was a Rhodes Scholar at Balliol College, and a doctoral research qualification from the University of Dar es Salaam, Tanzania (PhD) that included an analysis of colonial legal history in New Zealand, and a Diploma in Theology from the University of Oxford (DipTheol).

He is a barrister and solicitor of the High Court of New Zealand and holds a practising certificate to act as a barrister. He was employed as a legal academic at universities in England, Tanzania, and New Zealand from 1971 to 1991, and during that time he wrote numerous published articles and book chapters on issues related to colonial law, indigenous law and the Treaty of Waitangi.

From 1992 to 2000, his primary occupation was as a consultant contracted to research on law in history and on Treaty of Waitangi-related legal issues. He has acted in a variety of capacities in contracts with the Crown Forestry Rental Trust, the Law Commission, and Te Puni Kōkiri. He was responsible for the Māori Land Legislation Manual (and Database) which was published in two volumes by the Crown Forestry Rental Trust in 1994 and 1995. He is the author of Te Kooti Tango Whenua': The Native Land Court, 1864–1909 published by Huia Publishers in 1999.

Williams made front-page-news in 1978 when he walked into an Auckland Police station and asked to be arrested for stealing a pen from his employer. This was a protest against Police racism who two days earlier had arrested a Pacific Island migrant for stealing a comb from his employer.

He has acted as an arbitrator in respect of Māori-owned forestry land. He is the honorary legal adviser to Te Pīhopatanga o Aotearoa (Anglican Church) and a member of the Anglican Church's General Synod/Te Hinota Whanui. In 2001, he was appointed an associate professor in law at the University of Auckland, and in 2005 was promoted to full professor.

In 2018, Williams was elected a Fellow of the Royal Society of New Zealand.

Works by Williams 
 Crown policy affecting Māori knowledge systems and cultural practices  Wellington, New Zealand: Waitangi Tribunal, 2001.
 Mātauranga Māori and taonga: the nature and extent of Treaty rights held by iwi and hapū in indigenous flora and fauna, cultural heritage objects, valued traditional knowledge Wellington, New Zealand: Waitangi Tribunal, 2001.
 Taking into account of te ao Maori in relation to reform of the law of succession: a working paper  (with Pat Hohepa) Wellington, New Zealand: Law Commission, 1996.
 Te Kooti tango whenua: The Native Land Court 1864–1909 Wellington, N.Z. : Huia Publishers, 1999.
 Waitangi revisited : perspectives on the Treaty of Waitangi edited by Michael Belgrave, Merata Kawharu and David Williams.  Oxford University Press, 2005.

References

External links
David Williams – Faculty of Law

Year of birth missing (living people)
Living people
Legal educators
Legal writers
20th-century New Zealand lawyers
Academic staff of the University of Auckland
Victoria University of Wellington alumni
Alumni of Balliol College, Oxford
New Zealand Rhodes Scholars
People educated at Whanganui Collegiate School
Fellows of the Royal Society of New Zealand
21st-century New Zealand lawyers